Tanmay Ssingh (born 18 September 1991) is an Indian actor in Bollywood films. Tanmay's debut film as lead actor was 'Sayonee' which was produced by lucky Morani and Mohomed Morani. This movie was inspired by the iconic 90s song 'Sayonee' sung by Lahore’s sufi rock band Junoon. Tanmay will be soon feature in a signal Patthar Wargi of T series with Hina Khan and B Praak. Tanmay recently signed a three song video deal with the producer of Patthar Wargi.

Film career
Tanmay Ssingh was born to Mukesh and Chitra Sachdeva. He was born and raised in New Delhi. After completing graduation he attended the Asmita theatre group in New Delhi.

Actor

References

External links
 Tanmay Ssingh on Filmibeat
 Tanmay Ssingh on IMDB
 Tanmay Ssingh at Bollywood Hungama
 Tanmay Singh at Times of India 

1991 births
Indian male film actors
Living people
Male actors from Delhi
Male actors in Hindi cinema